Acalyptris loranthella is a moth of the family Nepticulidae. It is found in south-eastern Europe. It has been recorded from the Czech Republic, Slovakia, eastern Austria, Hungary, Italy, Sicily, Romania and Greece. It is probably also present throughout the Balkan peninsula and in Turkey.

The wingspan is 3.7–5.5 mm.

The larvae feed on Loranthus europaeus. They mine the leaves of their host plant. The mine consists of a gallery, often starting as a spiral mine, with the coils amalgamating to form a small blotch. The gallery often crosses an earlier course, thereby forming a false blotch. The frass is brownish and starts as broken linear tract, later it becomes slightly coiled or dispersed, filling one third to one half of mine width.

References

External links 
 Acalyptris Meyrick: revision of the platani and staticis groups in Europe and the Mediterranean (Lepidoptera: Nepticulidae)

Nepticulidae
Moths of Europe
Moths of Asia
Moths described in 1937